Holcocerus tancrei is a moth in the family Cossidae. It is found in Iran, Afghanistan, Turkmenistan and Uzbekistan. The habitat consists of deserts.

References

Natural History Museum Lepidoptera generic names catalog

Cossinae
Moths of Asia
Moths described in 1898